Urophora phalolepidis is a species of tephritid or fruit flies in the genus Urophora of the family Tephritidae.

Distribution
Italy.

References

Urophora
Insects described in 1991
Diptera of Europe